Veríssimo Manuel Aguiar Cabral (Ponta Delgada, 25 May 1825 — Ponta Delgada, 28 October 1891) was a lawyer and politician who, among other functions, was the Civil Governor of the District of Ponta Delgada.

1891 deaths
1825 births
Azorean politicians